Isa ibn Ali Al Khalifa  (1848–9 December 1932) was the ruler of Bahrain from 1869 until his death. His title was Hakim of Bahrain. He is one of the longest reigning monarchs of the region, a reign lasting 63 years. He was forced by the British political advisor, Clive Kirkpatrick Daly, to abdicate in 1923, although this "abdication" was never recognised by Bahrainis who considered his successor Hamad only as a viceruler until Isa's death in 1932.

Biography
Isa ibn Ali Al Khalifa was born on 27 November 1848, in Riffa Fort, Bahrain, the fourth-born son of Sheikh Ali bin Khalifa Al Khalifa with Tajba bint Ahmad Al Khalifa, daughter of Shaikh Ahmad bin Salman Al Khalifa.

Shaikh Isa’s father, Shaikh Ali, was the ruler of Bahrain in 1868 after Muhammad bin Khalifa Al Khalifa was forced to abdicate by the British after an alleged violation of the 1861 treaty which prevented him from carrying out maritime depredations. In August 1869, a large force led by Nasir bin Mubarak invaded Bahrain and killed the ruler, Shaikh Isa’s father. Nasir’s cousin, Mohammed ibn Abdullah, usurped the throne after the murder and assumed the Sheikhdom. Shaikh Isa fled to Zubarah, to be treated by the Al Noaim tribe who remained loyal to his rule. In December 1869, a British force under the Political Resident Lewis Pelly with the will and desire of the people of Bahrain, Shaikh Isa arrived and deposed the usurper who was captured by the British and sent to prison in India where he died a captive in 1877. Shaikh Isa ruled from 2 December 1869.

On 22 December 1880, Isa concluded a protectorate treaty with the United Kingdom to abstain from making any treaties or engagements with any other foreign power or state without British consent. Isa became sole ruler on the death of his brother in October 1888, when his title was altered from Chief to Ruler of Bahrain (Hakim). The protectorate treaty was confirmed and extended on 13 March 1892, in which Isa also reiterating his desire to retain for himself the right to manage Bahrain's internal affairs. Under these treaties, the United Kingdom managed all of Bahrain's foreign policy and in this way Isa was not authorized to conclude treaties independently with other powers. Shaikh Isa successfully fought off with the assistance of his brother Shaikh Khalid bin Ali, a maritime force of the Al Binali tribe which attempted unsuccessfully in invading the Bahrain islands in 1895.

Isa was forced by the British political advisor, Clive Kirkpatrick Daly, to abdicate in 1923, although this "abdication" was never recognised by Bahrainis who considered his successor Hamad only as a viceruler until Isa's death in 1932. From 1926, at an old age, Isa was joined by a British consultant, Charles Belgrave, who helped him implement administrative reforms aimed at promoting social progress as laws for the regulation of pearl fishing, traditionally one of the main parts of the local economy.

Shaikh Isa died while praying the dawn prayers in his room in Muharraq on 9 December 1932 after a reign of 63 years, and was buried at Al Muharaq cemetery. His was the longest reign in Bahrain’s history, as well as one of the most long-lived rulers in the world. He was officially succeeded by his second-born son Hamad bin Isa Al Khalifa, his eldest son of eight having died in 1893.

Family
Isa had four wives: 
(first) Shaikha Haya bint Muhammad Al Khalifa, daughter of Shaikh Muhammad bin Salman bin Ahmad Al Khalifa, the divorced wife of his younger brother, Shaikh Ahmad bin ‘Ali Al Khalifa Al Haj.
(second) Shaikha Maryam bint Hamad al-Benali (fl 1951), daughter of Shaikh Hamad bin ‘Ali al-Benali.
(third) Shaikha Munira bint ‘Abdu’l Razak al-Khalifa.
(fourth) Shaikha Aisha bint Muhammad Al Khalifa (died at Muharraq, 26 December 1943), daughter of Shaikh Muhammad bin Khalifa Al Khalifa, Ruler of Bahrain, by his seventh wife, Aisha al-Jalhama.

Isa had five sons: 
 Shaikh Salman bin Isa al-Khalifa al-Haj (1873-1893), born at Manama, son of Haya. Died while returning from the Haj, near Riyadh, Arabia.
 Shaikh Hamad ibn Isa al-Khalifa (1875–1942), Ruler of Bahrain, son of Haya.
 Shaikh Rashid bin Isa al-Khalifa (1877-1902), born at Manama in 1877, son of Haya. Died from consumption.
 Shaikh Muhammad bin Isa al-Khalifa al-Haj (1878-10 November, 1964), born at Manama, son of Maryam.
 Shaikh ‘Abdu’llah bin Isa al-Khalifa (1883-23 April, 1966), born at Muharraq, son of Aisha.

and four daughters:
 Shaikha Noora bint Isa al-Khalifa. Married Shaikh Ibrahim bin Khalid al-Khalifa (1873-1933), eldest son of Shaikh Khalid bin ‘Ali al-Khalifa.
 Shaikha …bint Isa al-Khalifa. Married (first) Shaikh ‘Ali bin Ahmad al-Khalifa, son of Shaikh Ahmad bin ‘Ali al-Khalifa, and (second) September 1917, Shaikh Salman bin Khalid al-Khalifa, a cousin.
 Shaikha Moza bint Isa al-Khalifa, wife of Shaikh Ali bin Ahmed Al Khalifa.
 Shaikha Munira bint Isa al-Khalifa, daughter of Munira. Married Shaikh Khalifa bin Ahmad al-Khalifa (1875-??), son of her paternal uncle, Shaikh Ahmad bin ‘Ali al-Khalifa al-Haj.

Titles
1848–1869: Sheikh Isa ibn Ali Al-Khalifa
1869–1909: Sheikh Isa ibn Ali Al-Khalifa, Hakim of Bahrain
1909–1914: His Excellency Sheikh Isa ibn Ali Al-Khalifa, Hakim of Bahrain
1914–1919: His Excellency Sheikh Isa ibn Ali Al-Khalifa, Hakim of Bahrain, CSI
1919–1930: His Excellency Sheikh Sir Isa ibn Ali Al-Khalifa, Hakim of Bahrain, KCIE, CSI
1930–1932: His Highness Sheikh Sir Isa ibn Ali Al-Khalifa, Hakim of Bahrain, KCIE, CSI

Honours
Style of Excellency-1909
Personal 11-gun salute-1909
Companion of the Order of the Star of India (CSI)-1914
Knight Commander of the Order of the Indian Empire (KCIE)-1919
Style of Highness-1930

See also
 Al Khalifa
 History of Bahrain
 Bahrain administrative reforms of the 1920s
 List of longest reigning monarchs of all time

References

External links

1848 births
1932 deaths
House of Khalifa
Bahraini monarchs
20th-century Bahraini people
Honorary Knights Commander of the Order of the Indian Empire
Honorary Companions of the Order of the Star of India
19th-century Arabs